Ri Myong-sun (born 26 January 1992) is a North Korean table tennis player. She competed for North Korea at the 2012 Summer Olympics. She went on to compete for North Korea again at the 2016 Summer Olympics, where she beat Petrissa Solja of Germany in the third round of the women's singles.

References

Sportspeople from Pyongyang
North Korean female table tennis players
Table tennis players at the 2012 Summer Olympics
Table tennis players at the 2016 Summer Olympics
Olympic table tennis players of North Korea
1992 births
Living people
Asian Games medalists in table tennis
Table tennis players at the 2014 Asian Games
Asian Games bronze medalists for North Korea
Medalists at the 2014 Asian Games